SS Loreto, formerly Astrée, was a  cargo steamship that was built in England in 1912 for French owners and bought in 1933 by Italian owners who renamed her Loreto. In 1942 a Royal Navy submarine sank her in the Tyrrhenian Sea, killing 130 British Indian Army prisoners of war who were aboard.

Building and career
The Sunderland Shipbuilding Company of Sunderland, County Durham built the ship in 1912 as Astrée for G Lamy et Compagnie of Caen, France. She was managed for G Lamy by the Société Navale Caennaise. In 1933 Italian owners bought her, renamed her Loreto and appointed Lauro Lines to manage her. She passed through at least two individual owners until by 1937 Lauro Lines itself owned the ship.

The ship had a three-cylinder triple-expansion steam engine built by the North Eastern Marine Engineering Company of Newcastle.

Loss
On 9 October the UK Government Code and Cypher School intercepted an enemy signal about Loreto and transmitted an Ultra warning:
"Loreto will sail from Tripoli at 9.00 a.m. of the 9th, speed 7 knots, and should arrive to Naples at 07.30 a.m. of the 13th. It will transport 350 POWs."

At 1732 hrs the   torpedoed and sank her, killing 130 British Indian Army POWs who were on the cargo ship. Unruffled may not have received the signal, or she may not have identified Loreto before firing.

See also
, an Italian merchant ship that a Royal Navy submarine sank in December 1941, killing at least 300 UK and Dominion PoWs.
, an Italian cargo ship that a Royal Navy submarine sank in August 1942, killing 336 UK, Dominion and Allied PoWs.
, an Italian cargo ship that a Royal Navy submarine sank in November 1942, killing 830 Allied PoWs.

References

Sources

1912 ships
Merchant ships of France
Military of British India
Ships sunk by British submarines
Ships built on the River Wear
World War II merchant ships of Italy
World War II shipwrecks in the Mediterranean Sea
Maritime incidents in October 1942